Sisyrinchium funereum is an uncommon species of flowering plant in the family Iridaceae known by the common names Funeral Mountain blue-eyed grass and Death Valley blue-eyed-grass. It is endemic to the Mojave Desert of the United States, where it is known only from the Funeral Mountains and Death Valley area in eastern California, and the Ash Meadows area just over the border in Nevada. It grows in wet, highly alkaline habitat, such as seeps and mineral springs.

Description
Sisyrinchium funereum is rhizomatous perennial herb takes a clumpy form, producing pale green, waxy stems up to 70 to 76 centimeters in maximum height. The flower has six tepals measuring up to 1.5 centimeters long. They are light blue to purple-blue with yellow bases. The tepal tips are often squared or notched. The fruit is a beige capsule.

References

External links
Jepson Manual Treatment - Sisyrinchium funereum
USDA Plants Profile: Sisyrinchium funereum
Flora of North America; Sisyrinchium funereum
Sisyrinchium funereum - Photo gallery

funereum
Flora of the California desert regions
Flora of Nevada
Death Valley
Flora of North America
Taxa named by Eugene P. Bicknell